Woodworking is the skill of making items from wood, and includes cabinet making (cabinetry and furniture), wood carving, joinery, carpentry, and woodturning.

History

Along with stone, clay and animal parts, wood was one of the first materials worked by early humans. Microwear analysis of the Mousterian stone tools used by the Neanderthals show that many were used to work wood. The development of civilization was closely tied to the development of increasingly greater degrees of skill in working these materials.

Among early finds of wooden tools are the worked sticks from Kalambo Falls, Clacton-on-Sea and Lehringen. The spears from Schöningen (Germany) provide some of the first examples of wooden hunting implements. Flint tools were used for carving. Since Neolithic times, carved wooden vessels are known, for example, from the Linear Pottery culture wells at Kückhofen and Eythra.

Examples of Bronze Age wood-carving include tree trunks worked into coffins from northern Germany and Denmark and wooden folding-chairs. The site of Fellbach-Schmieden in Germany has provided fine examples of wooden animal statues from the Iron Age. Wooden idols from the La Tène period are known from a sanctuary at the source of the Seine in France.

Ancient Egypt
There is significant evidence of advanced woodworking in ancient Egypt. Woodworking is depicted in many extant ancient Egyptian drawings, and a considerable amount of ancient Egyptian furniture (such as stools, chairs, tables, beds, chests) have been preserved. Tombs represent a large collection of these artifacts and the inner coffins found in the tombs were also made of wood. The metal used by the Egyptians for woodworking tools was originally copper and eventually, after 2000 BC bronze as iron working was unknown until much later.

Commonly used woodworking tools included axes, adzes, chisels, pull saws, and bow drills. Mortise and tenon joints are attested from the earliest Predynastic period. These joints were strengthened using pegs, dowels and leather or cord lashings. Animal glue came to be used only in the New Kingdom period. Ancient Egyptians invented the art of veneering and used varnishes for finishing, though the composition of these varnishes is unknown. Although different native acacias were used, as was the wood from the local sycamore and tamarisk trees, deforestation in the Nile valley resulted in the need for the importation of wood, notably cedar, but also Aleppo pine, boxwood and oak, starting from the Second Dynasty.

Ancient Rome
Woodworking was essential to the Romans. It provided, material for buildings, transportation, tools, and household items. Wood also provided pipes, dye, waterproofing materials, and energy for heat.Although most examples of Roman woodworking have been lost, the literary record preserved much of the contemporary knowledge. Vitruvius dedicates an entire chapter of his De architectura to timber, preserving many details. Pliny, while not a botanist, dedicated six books of his Natural History to trees and woody plants, providing a wealth of information on trees and their uses.

Ancient China
The progenitors of Chinese woodworking are considered to be Lu Ban (魯班) and his wife Lady Yun, from the Spring and Autumn period (771 to 476 BC).  Lu Ban is said to have introduced the plane, chalk-line, and other tools to China. His teachings were supposedly left behind in the book Lu Ban Jing (魯班經, "Manuscript of Lu Ban"). Despite this, it is believed that the text was written some 1500 years after his death. This book is filled largely with descriptions of dimensions for use in building various items such as flower pots, tables, altars, etc., and also contains extensive instructions concerning Feng Shui. It mentions almost nothing of the intricate glue-less and nail-less joinery for which Chinese furniture was so famous.

Modern day

With the advances in modern technology and the demands of industry, woodwork as a field has changed. The development of Computer Numeric Controlled (CNC) Machines, for example, has made it possible to mass-produce and reproduce products faster, with less waste, and often with more complex design than ever before. CNC wood routers can carve complicated and highly detailed shapes into flat stock, to create signs or art.  Rechargeable power tools speed up creation of many projects and require much less body strength than in the past, for example when boring multiple holes. Skilled fine woodworking, however, remains a craft pursued by many. There remains demand for hand crafted work such as furniture and arts, however with rate and cost of production, the cost for consumers is much higher.

Materials
Historically, woodworkers relied upon the woods native to their region, until transportation and trade innovations made more exotic woods available to the craftsman. Woods are typically sorted into three basic types: hardwoods typified by tight grain and derived from broadleaf trees, softwoods from coniferous trees, and man-made materials such as plywood and MDF.

Hardwoods, botanically known as angiosperms, are deciduous and shed their leaves annually with temperature changes. Softwoods come from trees botanically known as gymnosperms, which are coniferous, cone-bearing, and stay green year round. Although a general pattern, softwoods are not necessarily always “softer” than hardwoods, and vice versa.

Softwood is most commonly found in the regions of the world with lower temperatures and is typically less durable, lighter in weight, and more vulnerable to pests and fungal attacks in comparison to hardwoods. They typically have a paler color and a more open grain than hardwoods, which contributes to the tendency of felled softwood to shrink and swell as it dries. Softwoods usually have a lower density, around 432–592 kg/m3, which can compromise its strength. Density, however, does vary within both softwoods and hardwoods depending on the wood's geographical origin and growth rate. However, the lower density of softwoods also allows it to have a greater strength with lighter weight. In the United States, softwoods are typically cheaper and more readily available and accessible. Most softwoods are suitable for general construction, especially framing, trim, and finish work, and carcassing.

Hardwoods are separated into two categories, temperate and tropical hardwoods, depending on their origin. Temperate hardwoods are found in the regions between the tropics and poles, and are of particular interest to wood workers for their cost-effective aesthetic appeal and sustainable sources. Tropical hardwoods are found within the equatorial belt, including Africa, Asia, and South America. Hardwoods flaunt a higher density, around 1041 kg/m3 as a result of slower growing rates and is more stable when drying. As a result of its high density, hardwoods are typically heavier than softwoods but can also be more brittle. While there are an abundant number of hardwood species, only 200 are common enough and pliable enough to be used for woodworking. Hardwoods have a wide variety of properties, making it easy to find a hardwood to suit nearly any purpose, but they are especially suitable for outdoor use due to their strength and resilience to rot and decay. The coloring of hardwoods ranges from light to very dark, making it especially versatile for aesthetic purposes. However, because hardwoods are more closely grained, they are typically harder to work than softwoods. They are also harder to acquire in the United States and, as a result, are more expensive.

Typically furniture such as tables and chairs is made using solid stock from hardwoods due to its strength and resistance to warping. Additionally, they also have a greater variety of grain patterns and color and take a finish better which allows the woodworker to exercise a great deal of artistic liberty. Hardwoods can be cut more cleanly and leave less residue on sawblades and other woodworking tools. Cabinet/fixture makers employ the use of plywood and other man made panel products.  Some furniture, such as the Windsor chair involve green woodworking, shaping with wood while it contains its natural moisture prior to drying.

Common softwoods used for furniture

Cedar 
Cedars are strong, aromatic softwoods that are capable of enduring outdoor elements, the most common of which is the western red cedar. Western red cedar can sustain wet environments without succumbing to rot, and as a result is commonly used for outdoor projects such as patios, outdoor furniture, and building exteriors. This wood can be easily found at most home centers in the USA and Canada for a moderate price.

Fir 
Within the USA fir, also known as Douglas fir, is inexpensive and common at local home centers. It has a characteristic straight, pronounced grain with a red-brown tint. However, its grain pattern is relatively plain and it does not stain well, so fir is commonly used when the finished product will be painted. While commonly used for building, this softwood would also be suitable for furniture-making.

Pine 
White pine, ponderosa, and southern yellow pine are common species used in furniture-making. White pine and ponderosa are typically used for indoor projects, while Southern yellow pine is recommended for outdoor projects due to its durability.

Common hardwoods used for furniture

Ash 
This hardwood is relatively easy to work with and takes stain well, but its white to light brown color with a straight grain is visually appealing on its own. However, ash is much more difficult to find than other common woods, and will not be found at the local home center. Larger lumber yards should have it in stock.

Beech 
Hardwood of the European species Fagus sylvatica is widely used for furniture framing and carcase construction, in plywood, musical instruments (drum shells and piano blocks) and turned items like knobs.

Birch 
Whether yellow or white birch, these hardwoods are stable and easy to work with. Despite this, birch is prone to blotching when stained, so painting birch products is probably best. Birch is easily found at many home centers and is a relatively inexpensive hardwood.

Cherry 
Popular and easy to work with, cherry is in high demand for its reddish-brown color and ease of staining and finishing. Cherry likely will not be at the local home center, but should be at a lumberyard for a somewhat expensive price. This hardwood is a very common material for furniture, and is resistant to normal wear-and-tear, but it is best for indoor pieces.

Mahogany 
A hardwood, mahogany has a trademark reddish-brown to deep-red tint and is known as "one of the great furniture woods". However, mahogany is not typically grown in sustainable forests, and thus runs a steep price at local lumber yards.

Oak 
With two varieties, red and white, oak is known to be easy to work with and relatively strong. However, furniture makers often opt for white oak over red oak for its attractive figure and moisture-resistance. Depending on the kind needed, oak can probably be found at a local home center or a lumberyard for a bit pricier than other hardwoods.

Maple 
With strength, sturdiness, and durability, maple is a common material for furniture for the bedroom and even china cabinets. Maple is moisture-resistant and frequently displays stand-out swirls in the wood grain, an aesthetically pleasing differentiator from other hardwoods. While most commonly a lighter color, maple also can take stains and paint well.

Factors in choosing materials 
There are many factors to consider when deciding what type of wood to use for a project. One of the most important is the workability of the wood: the way in which it responds when worked by hand or tools, the quality of the grain, and how it responds to adhesives and finishes. When the workability of wood is high, it offers a lower resistance when cutting and has a diminished blunting effect on tools. Highly workable wood is easier to manipulate into desired forms. If the wood grain is straight and even, it will be much easier to create strong and durable glued joints. Additionally, it will help protect the wood from splitting when nailed or screwed. Coarse grains require a lengthy process of filing and rubbing down the grain to produce a smooth result.

Another important factor is the durability of the wood, especially in regards to moisture. If the finished project will be exposed to moisture (e.g. outdoor projects) or high humidity or condensation (e.g. in kitchens or bathrooms), then the wood needs to be especially durable in order to prevent rot. Because of their oily qualities, many tropical hardwoods such as teak and mahogany are popular for such applications.

Woods with good working properties
Agba (Gossweilerodendron balsamiferum)

Alder (Alnus glutinosa)

Basswood (Tilia americana)

Obeah (Triplochiton scleroxylon)

Pine (Pinus)

Western cedar (Thuja plicata)

Very durable woods 
Teak (Tectona grandis)

Iron (Milicia excelsa)

Jarrah (Eucalyptus marginata)

Chestnut (Castanea)

Oak (Quercus)

Cedar (Thuja)

Woods used for carving 
While many woods can be used for carving, there are some clear favorites, including aspen, basswood, butternut, black walnut, and oak. Because it has almost no grain and is notably soft, Basswood is particularly popular with beginner carvers. It is used in many lower-cost instruments like guitars and electric basses. Aspen is similarly soft, although slightly harder, and readily available and inexpensive. Butternut has a deeper hue than basswood and aspen and has a nice grain that is easy to carve, and thus friendly for beginners. It is also suitable for furniture. While more expensive than basswood, aspen, and butternut, black walnut is a popular choice for its rich color and grain. Lastly, oak is a strong, sturdy, and versatile wood for carving with a defined grain. It is also a popular wood for furniture making.

Common tools 
Each area of woodworking requires a different variation of tools. Power tools and hand tools are both used for woodworking. Many modern woodworkers choose to use power tools in their trade for the added ease and to save time. However, many choose to still use only hand tools for several reasons such as the experience and the added character to the work, while some choose to use only hand tools simply for their own enjoyment.

Hand tools 
Hand tools are classified as tools that receive power only from the hands that are holding them. The more common modern hand tools are:

 Clamps are used to hold a workpiece while being worked. Clamps vary in all shapes and sizes from small c-clamps to very large bar or strap clamps. A vise is a form of clamp, temporarily or permanently mounted as required. A woodworking vise is a vise specialized to the needs of a woodworker; numerous types have evolved.

 Chisels are tools with a long blade, a cutting edge, and a handle. Used for cutting and shaping wood or other materials.

 The claw hammer, which can hammer, pry, and pull nails, is the most common hammer used in woodworking.

 A hand plane is used to surface aspects of a workpiece.

 The square is used to mark angles on any workpiece. An adjustable square also includes a ruler. A speed square can mark 90 and 45-degree fixed angles and any angle between 0 and 90 degrees using its long axis.

 A tape measure is a retractable or flexible ruler that has measurement increments as small as 1/32" or 1 millimetre.

Power tools 
Power tools are tools that are powered by an external energy such as a battery, motor, or a power cable connected to a wall outlet. The more common power tools are:

 The drill is a tool used to drill a hole or to insert a screw into a workpiece.

 A palm sander is a small powered sander that uses either a vibration or orbital motion to move a piece of sand paper upon the workpiece making very fine modifications in smoothing your product.

 A compound miter saw, also known as a chop saw is a stationary saw used for making precise cuts across the grain path of a board. These cuts can be at any chosen angle that the particular saw is capable of.

 A table saw is intended to make long precise cuts along the grain pattern of the board known as rip cuts. Most table saws offer the option of a beveled rip cut.

 A thickness planer is used to smooth the surface of a board and make it the exact thickness across the entire board.

 A jointer is used to produce a flat surface along a board's length and to create a square (or 90°) edge between two adjoining surfaces.
A band saw is used to make both irregularly shaped cuts and cuts through material thicker than a table saw can manage. It is much more robust than the jigsaw or more delicate scroll saw, also regularly used in woodworking.

Notable woodworkers

 Alvar Aalto
 Norm Abram
 John Boson
 Frank E. Cummings III
 Henning Engelsen
 Wharton Esherick
 Tage Frid
 Alexander Grabovetskiy
 Greta Hopkinson
 James Krenov
 Mark Lindquist
 Sal Maccarone
 Thomas J. MacDonald
 John Makepeace
 Sam Maloof
 David J. Marks
 Judy Kensley McKie
 George Nakashima
 Jere Osgood
 Alan Peters
 Matthias Pliessnig
 André Jacob Roubo
 Evert Sodergren
 Rosanne Somerson
 Henry O. Studley
 Roy Underhill
 Wendy Maruyama
 Charles H. Hayward

See also

 Boat building
 Cabinet making
 Carpentry
 Ébéniste
 Fire hardening
 Glossary of woodworking terms
 Green woodworking
 History of construction
 History of wood carving
 Intarsia
 Japanese carpentry
 Lath art
 Luthier
 Millwork
 Marionette
 Marquetry
 Saw pit
 Segmented turning
 Sloyd, a system of handicraft-based education
 Stave church
 Studio furniture
 Tack cloth
 Timber framing
 Turning
 Wood carving
 Wood glue
 Wood Inlay
 Woodturning
 Woodworking workbench

References

References

Further reading
 Naylor, Andrew. A review of wood machining literature with a special focus on sawing. BioRes, April 2013
 History of Woodworking & Ancient Carpentry

External links 

 Video about the Zafimaniry peoples in Madagascar.
 Videos about woodworking published by Institut für den Wissenschaftlichen Film. Available in the AV-Portal of the German National Library of Science and Technology.
 Woodwork Magazine

 
Crafts
Industrial processes
Scoutcraft